The Praga B2 was a low powered aero engine suitable for very light aircraft.  It dates from the mid-1930s.

Design
The Praga B2 was a dual ignition, air-cooled horizontal twin producing 40 horsepower (30 kW) aimed at lightweight aircraft.  It was a higher compression version (6.7:1 from the earlier 5.72:1) of the original and otherwise very similar Praga B, which provided 36 hp (27 kW).  Its cylinders were machined from alloy steel forgings and had aluminium alloy heads. The pistons were of aluminium alloy, with three compression rings and one scraper ring. The connecting rods were of nitrided steel, with divided big ends and bronze bushes at the little ends. The one piece crankshaft was also formed from nitrided steel and had two main roller bearings and a single ball thrust bearing. The single piece crankcase was cast from an aluminium alloy.

135 units in all, including B and B2 variants were built. Jowett Cars Ltd. of Idle, Bradford in the UK obtained a licence in 1936 to build the Praga B engine, for installation into the licence built Hillson Praga. Immediately after the end of World War II the Praga B2 was on display at the 1946 Paris Air Show.

Applications (B & B2)
Alaparma A.M.10 Tucano
AVEX Yakstas Racer

de Schelde Scheldemeeuw
de Schelde Scheldemusch
Hillson Pennine
Mignet Flying Flea
Praga E.114/Hillson Praga

Specifications (B2)

See also

References

Further reading

Boxer engines
1930s aircraft piston engines